The 1899 Gallaudet Bison football team represented Gallaudet University, a college for deaf-mutes, as a member of the Maryland Intercollegiate Football Association (MIFA) the 1899 college football season. The team was considered one of the best outside of the "big four".

Schedule

References

Gallaudet
Gallaudet Bison football seasons
Gallaudet Bison football